Imagine That is an American sitcom television series that aired from January 8 until January 15, 2002 on NBC.

Premise
A comedy writer uses his Walter Mitty-like fantasies as inspiration for his show.

Cast
Hank Azaria as Josh Miller
Jayne Brook as Wendy Miller
Joshua Malina as Kenny Fleck
Katey Sagal as Barb Thompson
Suzy Nakamura as Rina Oh
Julia Schultz as Tabitha Applethorpe
David Pressman as Seth Koozman

Episodes

References

External links

2002 American television series debuts
2002 American television series endings
2000s American sitcoms
English-language television shows
NBC original programming
Television series by ABC Studios
Television series by Sony Pictures Television